Press Castle is a village with 17th-century manor house and country estate in the Scottish Borders, 2m (3 km) west of Coldingham, by the Ale Water. NT871654.

The area is renowned for its colonies of red squirrels.

See also
List of places in the Scottish Borders
List of places in East Lothian
List of places in Midlothian
List of places in West Lothian

Gallery

External links
RCAHMS / CANMORE: Press Castle, country house
RCAHMS: Press Castle Walled Garden
RCAHMS: Press Castle doocot

Villages in the Scottish Borders